Eddie Steele (born July 4, 1988) is a former professional Canadian football defensive tackle who recently played for the Saskatchewan Roughriders of the Canadian Football League. He was drafted 22nd overall by the Hamilton Tiger-Cats in the 2010 CFL Draft. He played college football for the Manitoba Bisons.
As a kid, Eddie's first football team was the North Winnipeg Nomads, and later the Kelvin Clippers. He played a crucial role in the team winning a U of M Vanier Cup championship. Eddie has one older sister, (Jenny), and a younger  brother (Drayden) and younger sister (Raia).

References

External links
Saskatchewan Roughriders bio
Edmonton Eskimos bio

1988 births
Living people
Canadian football defensive linemen
Edmonton Elks players
Manitoba Bisons football players
Hamilton Tiger-Cats players
Players of Canadian football from Manitoba
Saskatchewan Roughriders players
Canadian football people from Winnipeg